The 2012–13 season was the 56th season in RK Zamet’s history. It is their 5th successive season in the Dukat Premier League, and 35th successive top tier season.

First team squad

Goalkeeper
 1  Marin Đurica
 1  Igor Saršon
 12  Dino Slavić
 16  Matko Vukić

Wingers
RW
 6  Dario Černeka
 15  Igor Montanari - Knez
 17  Davor Vukelić
LW
 2  Damir Vučko 
 4  Mateo Hrvatin
 15  Ivan Vučetić

Line players
 3  Tomislav Karaula
 7  Milan Uzelac (captain)
 10  Marko Kačanić
 20  Patrick Čuturić

Back players
LB
 8  Bojan Lončarić
 14  Andrej Kalač
 15  Davor Šunjić
CB
 5  Luka Mrakovčić
 9  Ivan Ćosić
 18  Matija Golik
 19  Marin Sakić
RB
 11  Marin Kružić
 13  Luka Kovačević

Technical staff
  President: Zlatko Kolić
  Sports director: Aleksandar Čupić 
  Sports director: Alvaro Načinović (from 11 October)
  Head Coach: Irfan Smajlagić 
  Assistant Coach: Marin Mišković
  Goalkeeper Coach: Valter Matošević (from 11 October)
  Fitness Coach: Branimir Maričević
  Tehniko: Williams Černeka

Competitions

Overall

Dukat Premier League

League table

Matches

Play-offs table

Matches

Croatian Cup

PGŽ Cup - Qualifier matches

Matches

EHF Cup

Friendlies

Transfers

In

References

RK Zamet seasons